Bina Rai (13 July 1931 – 6 December 2009), sometimes referred to as Beena Rai, was an Indian actress, primarily of the black and white era of Hindi cinema. She is most known for her roles in classics such as Anarkali (1953), Ghunghat (1960) and Taj Mahal (1963), and won the Filmfare Award for Best Actress for her performance in Ghunghat.

Early life
Bina Rai, born as Krishna Sarin, hailed from Lahore, Punjab, British India in 1931. Her family was uprooted from Lahore during the communal frenzy and was resettled in Uttar Pradesh. She went to school in Lahore and then attended IT college in Lucknow, Uttar Pradesh, India. Bina Rai lived in Kanpur until she moved out for acting. She had to convince her parents to allow her to act in films, she claimed that she went on a hunger strike to convince her disapproving parents to let her join films, and they finally relented.

Career
Bina Rai was a first year student of Arts in the Isabella Thoburn College of Lucknow in 1950, when she came across an advertisement for a talent contest, she applied and received a call from the sponsors. Although she had been active in college dramatics, a film career was never within her field of vision. Nevertheless, she went to Bombay to participate in the contest, where she won along with the 25,000 rupees in prize money, a leading role in Kishore Sahu's Kali Ghata (1951), which became her film debut, and also featured Kishore Sahu in the lead role.

Bina Rai was born on 13 July 1931, she signed the contract on her first film on 13 July 1950, namely Kali Ghata, her first film released on 13 July 1951, on this happy day she was engaged to Premnath. On 2 September 1952 she married actor Premnath, whose sister Krishna was married to the actor-director Raj Kapoor and was part of the Kapoor family. They had acted together in some films, the first movie in which he was paired with Rai was Aurat (1953), a Bollywood version of the tragic Biblical tale of Samson and Delilah (1949). The film was not a hit, but Bina Rai and Premnath fell in love with each other. They married and soon set up their own production unit, known as P.N. Films. Their first film from P.N. Films was Shagufa (1953) and they had pinned high hopes on it, but audiences rejected it. Neither Bina Rai's elfin charm nor Premnath's sensitive portrayal of the role of a doctor could save Shagufa from being a flop. And the films that followed Shagufa are Prisoner of Golconda, Samunder and Watan disappeared almost as soon as they hit the theatre screens. Thus the Premnath-Bina Rai pairing never clicked on the screen.

However, her films with leading man Pradeep Kumar remain her best-remembered performances, where she played the title role in Anarkali (1953), Taj Mahal and Ghunghat, for which she won the Filmfare Award for Best Actress.

In the 1970s, her son Prem Krishen became an actor and had one big hit; Dulhan Wohi Jo Piya Man Bhaye (1977), but couldn't sustain the momentum, so he turned producer, with the Cinevistaas banner, which went on produce TV series such as Kathasagar, Gul Gulshan Gulfam and Junoon. He launched his daughter Akanksha Malhotra as an actress in 2002 in his home productions, claiming that she reminds him so much of his mother Bina Rai.

Bina Rai stopped acting in films many years ago, claiming that women after a certain age don't get good roles. She also talks fondly of her husband Premnath, who had died on 3 November 1992. In 2002, their son, Kailash (Monty) released a tribute album, to his father on the occasion of his 10th death anniversary and 86th birth anniversary, titled Amar Premnath, released by Saregama. Her grandson, Siddharth Malhotra, directed the successful TV series on doctors; Sanjivani (2004).

Death
Bina Rai died on 6 December 2009, following a cardiac arrest. She is survived by her two sons, Prem Kishen and Kailash (Monty), and grandchildren Sidharth and Akansha. Prem Kishen had a short-term career as a film actor before shifting to film and television production; Cinevistaas Limited. Her grandson, Siddharth Malhotra is a film director, who made his debut with Dharma Productions's We Are Family (2010).

Awards 
 1961: Filmfare Award for Best Actress: Ghunghat

Filmography 
 1951: Kali Ghata
 1952: Sapna
 1953: Anarkali
 1953: Aurat 1953: Gauhar 1953: Shagufa 1953: Shole 1954: Meenar 1954: Prisoner of Golconda 1955: Insaniyat 1955: Madh Bhare Nain 1955: Marine Drive 1955: Sardar 1956: Chandrakant 1956: Durgesh Nandini 1956: Hamara Watan 1957: Bandi 1957: Chengiz Khan 1957: Hill Station 1957: Mera Salaam 1957: Sammundar 1957: Talaash 1960: Ghunghat 1962: Vallah Kya Baat Hai 1963: Taj Mahal 1966: Daadi Maa 1967: Ram Rajya 1968: Apna Ghar Apni Kahani''

References

External links 
 

Actresses in Hindi cinema
Indian film actresses
1931 births
2009 deaths
Actresses from Lucknow
Isabella Thoburn College alumni
Filmfare Awards winners